Vittorio Maggioni (20 December 1930 - 14 September 2017) was an Italian male middle distance runner who won eight national titles at senior level.

National titles
He won 8 national championships at individual senior level.
Italian Athletics Championships
800 metres: 1953
1500 metres: 1951, 1952, 1953, 1954
3000 m steeplechase: 1951, 1952, 1954

References

External links
 
 Web page of the Company founded by Vittorio Maggioni 

1930 births
2017 deaths
Italian male middle-distance runners
Italian male steeplechase runners